This is a list of lighthouses in Ivory Coast.

Lighthouses

See also
List of lighthouses in Liberia (to the west)
List of lighthouses in Ghana (to the east)
 Lists of lighthouses and lightvessels

References

External links

Ivory Coast
Lighthouses
Lighthouses